ReBirth is the ninth album by Masami Okui, released on 4 February 2004.

Track listing
Introduction
Lyrics: Masami Okui
Composition: Ikuo
Arrangement: Hideyuki Daichi Suzuki
Poison
Lyrics: Masami Okui
Composition, arrangement: Macaroni
Second Impact
 Lyrics, composition: Masami Okui
 Arrangement: Toshiro Yabuki
I Lost
Lyrics, composition: Masami Okui
Arrangement: Hideyuki Daichi Suzuki
Innocence
Lyrics: Masami Okui
Composition, arrangement: Monta

Lyrics, composition: Masami Okui
Arrangement: Monta
Triangle+α
Lyrics: Masami Okui
Composition, arrangement: Macaroni
Message (LA version)
Lyrics: Monta, Masami Okui
Composition, arrangement: Monta

Lyrics, composition: Masami Okui
Arrangement: Yamachi

Lyrics, composition: Masami Okui
Arrangement: Monta

Lyrics, composition: Masami Okui
Arrangement: Monta
Earth
Lyrics: Monta, Masami Okui
Composition, arrangement: Monta

Sources
Official website: Makusonia

2004 albums
Masami Okui albums